Numby may refer to:
 brand name for Iontocaine
 Numby Numby sinkhole in Australia